McGregor Glacier is a tributary glacier,  long and  wide, draining the southwest slopes of the Prince Olav Mountains in Antarctica, and flowing west to enter Shackleton Glacier just north of the Cumulus Hills. It was named by the Southern Party of the New Zealand Geological Survey Antarctic Expedition (1961–62) for V.R. McGregor, a geologist with that party.

References

Glaciers of Dufek Coast